Alla Shabanova (born 25 October 1982) is a Russian speed skater. She competed in two events at the 2010 Winter Olympics.

References

1982 births
Living people
Russian female speed skaters
Olympic speed skaters of Russia
Speed skaters at the 2010 Winter Olympics
Sportspeople from Dresden